Nguyễn Thiên Đạo (3 July 1940 – 20 November 2015) was a Vietnamese-French composer who worked in contemporary classical music. He was born in Hanoi, French Indochina, and came to France in 1953, where he studied composition with Olivier Messiaen. He lived in Paris, France. In 1974 he received the Prix Olivier Messiaen for composition awarded by the Fondation Erasmus in the Netherlands and the Prix André Caplet (Académie des Beaux-Arts) in 1984. He died in Paris on 20 November 2015 at the age of 75.

Works
 Tuyn Lua for chamber ensemble, Festival de Royan 1969.
 Koskom for large orchestra, Radio France 1971
 Ba Me Vietnam, for contrabass and twenty instruments, Festival de La Rochelle, 1972
 Mỵ Châu Trọng Thuỷ Opera in Vietnamese - premiere at the Opéra de Paris (Salle Favart), 1979.
 Concerto pour piano et orchestre, Rencontres de Metz, 1984
 Symphonie pour pouvoir with Orchestre National de France at the Théâtre des Champs Elysées, 1989
 Concerto 1789 (pour sextuor à cordes et orchestre), with the Orchestre National de Lille at the Palais des Congrès of Lille.
 Les enfants d’Izieu opéra-oratorio Festival d’Avignon 1994
 Hoa Tâu Hanoi Opera 1995
 Khai Nhac Hanoi Opera 1997
 Giao-Hoa Sinfonia, Salle Olivier Messiaen Radio France 1998
 Sóng hồn ("Married") opera. Premiere Hanoi Opera House in Vietnam. 2000
 Arco Vivo for violoncello solo 2000
 Kosmofonia pour grand orchestre et chœur Forbach 2001
 Sóng nhất nguyên (Monastic Wave)  2002
  Sóng nhạc Trương Chi (The Wave of Music) Opéra de Hanoî  2003
 Quatre Lyriques de ciel et de terre, opéra de chambre Paris 2004
 Suoi Lung May, 1er Festival de Musique International Hué 2006.
 Khoi Thap, Hanoi Opera 2007
 So Day, Hanoi Opera 2007
 Duo Vivo, hommage à Olivier Messiaen, Théâtre des Bouffes du Nord 2008,
 Định mệnh bất chợt Oratorio – "Thanh xướng kịch KIỀU của Nguyễn Thiện Đạo" 2012

Discography
 Nguyễn Thiệ̣n Đạo Bat Khuat Marius Constant Equal Jacques Delécluse  Quintuple Les Percussions de l'Orchestre de Paris EMI France LP 1971
 Nguyễn Thiệ̣n Đạo Phu Dông. Gio Dông. Bà Me Viêt-nam. Erato France LP 1979

References

External links
Nguyen Thien Dao official site
Vietnamnet 2004 Article ?
Vietnamnet 2004 Article ?
Vietbao 2003  Nguyễn Thiên Đạo dựng opera "Sóng tình Trương Chi"
Article (Vietnamese)

1940 births
2015 deaths
People from Hanoi
20th-century classical composers
Vietnamese composers
Vietnamese emigrants to France
Musicians of Vietnamese descent
Musicians from Paris
Male classical composers
20th-century French musicians
20th-century French male musicians